Muhlenberg County High School is a four year high school located in Greenville, Kentucky, United States. The high school is located at 501 Robert Draper Way (Kentucky Route 189) in Greenville.

History 
The school was established in 2009 after the consolidation of the former Muhlenberg North and Muhlenberg South High Schools, both located in Greenville, respectively. Since then, it is the only high school serving the Muhlenberg County School system.

References

External links
Muhlenberg County Schools

Schools in Muhlenberg County, Kentucky
Public high schools in Kentucky
2009 establishments in Kentucky
Greenville, Kentucky
Educational institutions established in 2009